The Japanese Cemetery Park (Japanese: 日本人墓地公園; rōmaji: Nihonjin bochi kōen) is a Japanese cemetery and park in Hougang, Singapore. It is the largest Japanese cemetery in Southeast Asia at 29,359 square metres, consisting of 910 tombstones that contain the remains of members of the Japanese community in Singapore, including young Japanese prostitutes, civilians, soldiers and convicted war criminals executed in Changi Prison. It was gazetted as a memorial park by the Singapore government in 1987.

History 
The Japanese brothel owner, Tagajiro Fukaki, donated  of his rubber plantation to be used as a burial ground for young Japanese women who died in destitution. Together with other brothel owners Shibuya Ginji and Nakagawa Kikuzo, they applied for the permission and the British colonial government officially granted permission for this use on 26 June 1891. Since then, it was used to bury Japanese residents. During World War II, the cemetery was used to bury civilians and soldiers who lost their lives on the battlefield or to illness. After the British repatriated all the Japanese in 1948, no Japanese were allowed back into Singapore or Malaya for fear of their war past. The Singapore government took over ownership of the cemetery and left it disused. This policy towards the Japanese dead in Singapore remained until the Official Peace Treaty was signed with Japan in 1951. In November 1952, Ken Ninomiya, the first post-war Japanese Consul-General to Singapore, was tasked to find out the fate of Japanese war remains in Singapore. Upon locating the remains, the aim was to repatriate the ashes of the dead.

However, the Japanese government eventually decided it would not remove the remains of the Japanese war dead to a separate cemetery nor would they repatriate the ashes. This was because the surrendered Japanese personnel had put so much effort to erect a memorial in the cemetery for their fallen comrades earlier and as such the memorial was a type of a shrine in itself as well as the fact that all ashes had been entombed in one single mound which made any form of identification impossible.
In 1969, the Singapore government handed back ownership of the cemetery to the reformed Japanese Association, which oversees the maintenance of the cemetery. Burials continued until 1973 when the Singapore government passed an ordinance preventing the further expansion of the 42 cemeteries on the island.

Notable graves

Yamamoto Otokichi 

Yamamoto Otokichi, also known as "John Matthew Ottoson", was born in Onoura Village at Chita District of Owari (now Mihama Town of Aichi Prefecture) in 1818. In 1832, he was a sailor on board the ship "Hojun-maru", which sailed from Ise Bay to Tokyo. The ship drifted out of the sea at Toba in a storm. Otokichi managed to survive the disaster and was washed ashore at Cape Alava on the west coast of the United States after one year and two months. He eventually travelled around the world but Japan's isolationist policy at that time denied his return to his home country. Even after being rejected by his home country, he stayed proud to be a Japanese and helped to promote the opening of the country. He later became a successful trader. In 1862, Otokichi moved from Shanghai and stayed in Singapore with his Malay wife to become the first Japanese resident here. He died at the age of 49 in 1867.

In February 2004, Leong Foke Meng of the Singapore Land Authority (SLA), with the help of the National Environment Agency (NEA), helped to uncover facts confirming Otokichi's remains at the Choa Chu Kang Government Cemeteries. On 27 November 2004, Leong, together with Mihama Town and the Japanese Association, initiated the exhumation of Otokichi's remains at the Choa Chu Kang Christian Cemetery. The remains were later cremated and ashes stored at the columbarium of the Japanese Cemetery. On 17 February 2005, a delegation of about 100 residents from Mihama Town visited Singapore and brought back to Japan a portion of Otokichi's ashes, realising the home-coming of Otokichi's remains after 173 years.

Japanese War Memorials 

Before their repatriation in 1947, the surrendered Japanese prisoners-of-war who were used as manual labourers by the British took it upon themselves to commemorate their war dead. A group of them decided to clean up the cemetery and setting up Hisaichi Terauchi's tombstone in the eastern corner of the cemetery and three tombstones in the western corner of the cemetery with this inscription:

Their work remained undisturbed by the British authorities as they could not read the Japanese inscriptions on the memorials and were too busy rebuilding the city. Behind this memorial, the ashes of 10,000 Japanese war dead collected mainly from the destroyed Syonan Chureito (now the Bukit Batok Memorial) were put into a hole which was sealed with concrete. Terauchi's tombstone and three other distinctive memorials in the cemetery were completed by three Japanese prisoners-of-war—carpenter Kunio Higashituji, and stonemasons Tomokatsu Mizuya and Tokiyaki Tetsuka—in April 1947.

There is a small concrete pillar known as A memorial to the ashes of 135 martyrs, which marks the spot where the ashes of the 135 Japanese officers and men who were executed at Changi Prison are buried. A similar pillar on another corner of the west end marks the burial spot of the ashes of 79 Japanese who were executed in Malaysia.

Terauchi Hisaichi 

Born in 1879, Terauchi Hisaichi was the son of Terauchi Masatake, the 18th Japanese prime minister and a close relative of the emperor Hirohito. He attended the Japanese Military Academy and joined the Japanese Army after graduating the Academy in 1900. Terauchi spent time in Germany and worked as a lecturer at the Military Academy before taking command of the 5th Division and the Chief of Staff of the Korean Army, and later as the head of the Formosa Army. In October 1935, he was promoted to General and War Minister in 1937. Terauchi was the commander of the North China Area Army before becoming the Commander of Southern Army on 6 November 1941 – the Japanese equivalent to the British South East Asia Command – and devising strategies with Isoroku Yamamoto.

After leading the conquest of the Southern Area, he established his headquarters in Singapore. Promoted to field marshal, he moved to the Philippines in May 1944. When this area came under threat he retreated to Saigon. After receiving bad news about Burma he suffered a stroke on 10 April 1945. As such, the Japanese surrender in Singapore to the Allied forces led by Louis Mountbatten was represented by Itagaki Seishiro, commander of the 7th Area Army, on 12 September 1945. After the formal surrender, Terauchi was flown to Singapore from Saigon to present his two samurai swords to Mountbatten, on learning that Mountbatten had expressed his wish to have the swords. Terauchi was tried for war crimes, and was imprisoned in Johor, Malaysia, pending war crimes investigations by the British, until his death in June 1946. His remains were cremated and some of his ashes are believed to be buried at the park. The inscription on his tombstone reads:

Hinomoto Guardian Deity 
Located near the main entrance, this memorial was built in memory of 41 Japanese civilians who died in the internment camp at Jurong while waiting for repatriation after the Japanese surrender in World War II.

Tani Yutaka 
His life story has been depicted in novels and in a film titled . "Tiger of Malaya" is just his nickname in Japan. It's not related to Sandokan's novels nor to Tomoyuki Yamashita (he was also called "Marai no Tora" in Japan). It is debatable that Tani Yutaka is the true "Harimau Malaya" or "Tiger of Malaya" and not Tomoyuki Yamashita.

Tani Yutaka was born in Japan in 1910 and moved to Terengganu with his family when he was two. He is the son to the Japanese family which have their own grocery shop in Hulu Terengganu or barber shop. On a side note, Sandokan or "Tiger of Malaysia" is fictional.

Futabatei Shimei 
Futabatei Shimei (1864—1909) was a writer who first brought realism to Japanese literature. Fluent in Russian, he translated books written by realists, such as Ivan Turgenev, into Japanese while working as a correspondent for the Asahi Shimbun in Russia. On his way home, he fell ill on board a ship and died en route. The structure is not a tomb, but a memorial.

Ueyama Kantarō 
The tomb of Ueyama Kantarō, the first son of the inventor of the mosquito coil, Ueyama Eiichirō, is a large and unique lantern-like monument. He died in 1942, when his plane crashed in Sembawang airport.

Nagano Saneyoshi 
Another noteworthy occupant of the park is Nagano Saneyoshi, the founder of the Yamato Company in Tokyo. The company is known for manufacturing and selling of stationery products.

Karayuki-san 
During the Meiji era, many Japanese girls from poor households were taken to East Asia and Southeast Asia in the second half of the 19th century to work as prostitutes. Many of these women are said to have originated from the Amakusa Islands of Kumamoto Prefecture, which had a large and long-stigmatised Japanese Christian community.

Flora 

An old lychee tree found in the park is designated as a Heritage Tree by the National Parks Board (NParks). However, due to Singapore's climate it is unable to bear fruit. Another old "resident" of the park, a rubber tree, is also a Heritage Tree, remaining from the time when the park was a rubber plantation.

Current situation 

The Japanese Association of Singapore still continues to maintain the cemetery, which has since become a memorial park in 1987 for the appreciation of history and for its natural flora and fauna. As a legacy of the history of Japan and Singapore, the cemetery park is often visited by Japanese students, veterans, residents and tourists.

The current caretaker is an Indian national named Mani who succeeded the previous tomb keeper, the late Lim Geok Qi. Lim, who passed on in 2018, has been working in the Cemetery and for the Japanese Association for over 50 years. Lim was born in 1938, and lived most of his life in the Cemetery. Lim's adoptive father, surnamed Weng, found difficulty to find work when he first arrived in Singapore from China but was soon recommended to a job as a tomb keeper at the Japanese Cemetery. Lim grew up in the cemetery assisting his father in the cremating bodies and arranging burials at the cemetery. When the young Lim came of age, he tried to seek other forms of employment but in 1960, his father fell sick, and requested him to take over his duties as tomb keeper. And so the young man in his 20s took over his father's duties to become the second generation tomb keeper. Like his father, Lim was paid a minimal salary for the job, but given free accommodation and transportation. As he was thrifty in nature, he was able to start his own family, and expanded his living quarters when his family size grew. In 1973, new burials was not allowed, so Lim's main duties was to look after and maintain the Japanese cemetery, as well as serving as a cemetery guide for visitors from Japan.

See also 

Bukit Batok Memorial
Japanese cemeteries and cenotaphs
Middle Road, Singapore
Poh Ern Shih Temple

References

Notes

Bibliography

External links

Cemeteries in Singapore
History of Singapore
Monuments and memorials in Singapore
Tourist attractions in North-East Region, Singapore
Parks in Singapore
Hougang
Japan–Singapore relations